Azeglio, or less commonly Azelio, is an Italian masculine given name. Famous people with this given name include:
Azelio Manzetti (1929–2013), Italian priest
Azeglio Vicini (1933–2018), Italian football coach
Carlo Azeglio Ciampi (1920–2016), Italian politician.

Italian masculine given names